The 2006–07 New Zealand V8 season (the leading motorsport category in New Zealand) consisted of seven rounds beginning on 3 November 2006 and ending 22 April 2007. The defending champion was Kayne Scott, although it would be John McIntyre who would win his first New Zealand V8 Touring Car championship.

Calendar

Points structure

Championship standings

References

NZ Touring Cars Championship seasons
V8 season
V8 season